Traffic pattern can refer to
Information traffic patterns
Airfield traffic patterns

See also
 Traffic analysis